Humorous Phases of Funny Faces is a 1906 short silent animated cartoon directed by James Stuart Blackton and generally regarded by film historians as the first animated film recorded on standard picture film.

Content 
In the cartoon, animated hand-drawn scenes appear on a chalkboard, including a clown playing with a hat and a dog jumping through a hoop. In the beginning, though, the cartoonist's hands are included, too, as he draws the first several lines on the chalkboard in standard live action. From there, the stop-motion technique is used to show what appears to be drawings completing—and then moving—by themselves with no artist on screen.

Techniques 

Stop-motion as well as cutout animation are used, just as Edwin Porter moved his letters in How Jones Lost His Roll, and The Whole Dam Family and the Dam Dog. However, there is a very short section of the film where things are made to appear to move by altering the drawings themselves from frame to frame.

The film moves at 20 frames per second.

See also 
 Fantasmagorie
 The Enchanted Drawing
 History of animation

References

External links 
 
 
 
 Humorous Phases of Funny Faces at the Library of Congress
 

1906 films
1906 short films
1906 animated films
Animated comedy films
1900s animated short films
American black-and-white films
American silent short films
Films directed by J. Stuart Blackton
1906 comedy films
Vitagraph Studios short films
Silent American comedy films
Articles containing video clips
American comedy short films
1900s American films